Joshua Butler Wright (October 18, 1877 – December 4, 1939)  was a United States diplomat who served as representative of the US in Hungary, Uruguay, Czechoslovakia, and Cuba. He was the twentieth and last Third Assistant Secretary of State.

Wright was born in Irvington, in Westchester County, New York on 18 October 1877, the son of C. R. Wright. J. Butler Wright later married Maude A. Wolfe of Tuxedo Park, in June 1902.

In 1925 Wright was serving as Assistant Secretary of State under president Calvin Coolidge and Secretary of State Charles Evans Hughes.
 
Coolidge appointed Wright to serve as Envoy to Hungary in 1927. Herbert Hoover appointed Wright as Envoy to Uruguay in 1930, and Franklin D. Roosevelt appointed Wright as Envoy to Czechoslovakia in 1934, and afterwards as the U.S. Ambassador to Cuba from 1937 to 1939. During his stint as ambassador to Cuba, the SS St. Louis with its cargo of mostly German Jewish refugees tried to land in Havana in 1939. This incident was the basis for the 1976 film Voyage of the Damned.

Wright died at his post in Havana on 4 December 1939 after an operation.

References

 

1877 births
1939 deaths
People from Irvington, New York
Ambassadors of the United States to Cuba
Ambassadors of the United States to Czechoslovakia
Ambassadors of the United States to Hungary
Ambassadors of the United States to Uruguay
United States Assistant Secretaries of State
United States Foreign Service personnel